Rusudan is a feminine Georgian name of Old Persian origin, today widely used in Georgia. 

Other forms of name Rusudan used in Georgian are: Rusa, Ruso, Rusiko and Ruska.

It may refer to:
 Rusudan of Georgia (c. 1194-1245), queen regnant of Georgia (1223-1245)
 Rusudan, daughter of Demetre I of Georgia (12th-13th c.), Georgian princess royal
 Rusudan, daughter of Giorgi III of Georgia (12th-13th c.), Georgian princess royal
 Rusudan of Georgia, Empress of Trebizond (13th c.), Georgian princess royal
 Rusudan of Circassia (died 1740), queen consort of Kartli
 Rusudan Goletiani (born September 8, 1980), Georgian-American chess player
 Rusudan Khoperia, Georgian gymnast 
 Rusudan Sikharulidze, Georgian gymnast 
 Rusudan Petviashvili, Georgian artist 
 Rusudan Bolkvadze, Georgian actress 
Rusudan Gotsiridze, Georgian evangelical bishop 
Rusudan Chkonia, Georgian film director 
Rusudan Glurjidze, Georgian film director 
Rusudan Goginashvili, Georgian swimmer

Georgian feminine given names